Stephen John Jack (born 27 March 1971) is a Scottish former footballer who played for Queen's Park, Clydebank, Stirling Albion, Cowdenbeath and Dumbarton.

References

1971 births
Scottish footballers
Dumbarton F.C. players
Queen's Park F.C. players
Stirling Albion F.C. players
Cowdenbeath F.C. players
Clydebank F.C. (1965) players
Scottish Football League players
Living people
Association football midfielders